Meshingomesia Cemetery and Indian School Historic District is a historic Indian school, cemetery, and national historic district located in Pleasant Township, Grant County, Indiana. This site was historically used for a variety of purposes including education, recreation, cultural, civic and government, and ceremonial. It is also known as Mihsiinkweemisa Cemetery and Indian School Historic District. It was listed on the National Register of Historic Places in 2013.

History 
It encompasses a school building (c. 1870), a cemetery, and grave markers located on a portion of land reserved by the Miami Nation during the period of treaty making between 1794 and 1840.  The property has been continuously owned by the Miami (Myaamia) people. 

The school building was moved to its present location about 1944 and restored in 1998. It is not known how many people were buried here. Not all of the burial markers are intact, with roughly 65 visible gravestones.

References

External links
 
 

Historic districts on the National Register of Historic Places in Indiana
School buildings on the National Register of Historic Places in Indiana
Cemeteries on the National Register of Historic Places in Indiana
Greek Revival architecture in Indiana
Historic districts in Grant County, Indiana
National Register of Historic Places in Grant County, Indiana